Leonard Alufurai, OBE (1925–2000) was the inaugural  Bishop of Malaita.

Alufurai was born in Lau Lagoon, Malaita and educated at St. Mary's School, Maravovo, All Hallows' School, Te Aute College and  St. John's College, Auckland. He was ordained deacon  in 1952, and priest in 1956. Later he was Rural Dean of Malaita, then Archdeacon of the East Solomons from 1968 to 1975. He was also a member of the Malaita Council. On 30 November 1963 he and Dudley Tuti were consecrated Assistant Bishops in the Diocese of Melanesia.

References

Anglican bishops of Malaita
20th-century Anglican bishops in Oceania
1925 births
2000 deaths
Officers of the Order of the British Empire
Solomon Islands expatriates in New Zealand